Periyakulam is a state assembly constituency in Theni district in Tamil Nadu, India. Elections were not held in the years 1957 and 1962. It includes the two major towns Theni and Periyakulam. It is one of the 234 State Legislative Assembly Constituencies in Tamil Nadu, in India.

Madras State

Tamil Nadu

Election results

2021

2019 By-election

2016

2011

2006

2001

1996

1991

1989

1984

1980

1977

1971

1967

1952

References 
Footnotes

Bibliography
 

Assembly constituencies of Tamil Nadu
Theni district